Kyle is a unisex English-language given name, derived from the Scottish Gaelic surname Kyle, which is itself from a region in Ayrshire (from the Scottish Gaelic caol "narrow, strait").

The feminine given name Kyle has been superseded by the more modern Kyla.

People

A–C

Kyle (musician) (born 1993), American rapper, singer, songwriter, and actor 
Kyle Abbott (disambiguation), multiple people
Kyle Abeysinghe (born 2000), Sri Lankan swimmer
Kyle Abraham (born 1977), American choreographer
Kyle Adams (born 1988), American football tight end 
Kyle Adnam (born 1993), Australian basketball player
Kyle Alcorn (born 1985), American track and field athlete
Kyle Allen (born 1996), American football quarterback
Kyle Allison (born 1990), Scottish professional goalkeeper
Kyle Altman (born 1986), American soccer player
Kyle Amor (born 1987), English professional rugby league footballer
Kyle Alandy Amor, American visual artist, commercial model, singer, and actor of Filipino descent
Kyle Anderson (disambiguation), multiple people
Kyle Andrews (born 1982), American songwriter and performer
Kyle Arrington (born 1986), American football cornerback
Kyle Asante (born 1991), English footballer
Kyle Austin (born 1988), American professional basketball player
Kyle Bagwell (born 1961), American economics professor
Kyle Baker (born 1965), American writer and illustrator of comic books
Kyle Balda (born 1971), American animator and film director 
Kyle Baldock (born 1991), Australian BMX rider
Kyle Barker (born 2000), English footballer
Kyle Barone (born 1989), American basketball player
Kyle Barraclough (born 1990), American baseball player
Kyle Bartsch (born 1991), American baseball player
Kyle Bartley (born 1991), English footballer
Kyle Basler (born 1982), American football punter
Kyle Bass (born 1969), founder and principal of Hayman Capital Management, L.P.
Kyle Baun (born 1992), Canadian ice hockey player
Kyle Beach (born 1990), Canadian professional ice hockey player
Kyle Beckerman (born 1982), American soccer player
Kyle Bekker (born 1990), Canadian soccer player
Kyle Bell (born 1985), American football fullback
Kyle Benedictus (born 1991), Scottish footballer
Kyle Bennett (disambiguation), multiple people
Kyle Berkshire (born 1996), American racing driver
Kyle Bibb (born 1987), English rugby league footballer
Kyle Biggar (born 1986), Canadian professor
Kyle Bird (born 1993), American baseball player
Kyle Blanks (born 1986), American professional baseball outfielder and first baseman
Kyle Bochniak (born 1987), American mixed martial artist
Kyle Boddy (born 1983), American baseball trainer
Kyle Boller (born 1981), American football quarterback
Kyle Bornheimer (born 1975), American actor
Kyle Bosworth (born 1986), American football outside linebacker
Kyle Bradish (born 1996), American baseball player
Kyle Brady (born 1972), former professional American football player
Kyle Brandt (born 1979), American actor and TV presenter
Kyle Harrison Breitkopf (born 2005), American child actor
Kyle Bridgwood (born 1989), South African born Australian cyclist
Kyle Briggs (born 1987), English rugby league player
Kyle Brindza (born 1993), American football player
Kyle Brodziak (born 1984), Canadian ice hockey player
Kyle Brown (disambiguation), multiple people
Kyle Bruckmann (born 1971), American composer and oboist
Kyle Burkhart (born 1986), American football tackle
Kyle Burroughs (born 1995), Canadian ice hockey player
Kyle Busch (born 1985), NASCAR racer
Kyle Calder (born 1979), Canadian ice hockey player
Kyle Calloway (1987–2016), American football offensive tackle
Kyle Cameron (born 1997), English professional footballer
Kyle Carlson (born 1978), fashion model, twin brother of Lane Carlson
Kyle Carpenter (born 1989), United States Marine Corps Corporal
Kyle Carter (born 1992), American football tight end
Kyle Cassidy (born 1966), American photographer
Kyle Cave, professor of psychology at UMass Amherst
Kyle Cease (born 1977), American actor, comedian, and motivational speaker
Kyle Cerminara (born 1983), American Olympic wrestler
Kyle Chandler (born 1965), American actor
Kyle Chapman (disambiguation), multiple people
Kyle Chavarria (born 1995), American teen actress
Kyle Chen (born 2000), New Zealand boxer
Kyle Cheney (disambiguation), multiple people
Kyle Chipchura (born 1986), Canadian professional ice hockey centre
Kyle Christy (born 1992), American college football player
Kyle Clement (born 1985), American football defensive tackle
Kyle Clemons (born 1990), American track and field sprinter
Kyle Clifford (born 1991), Canadian ice hockey winger
Kyle Clifton (born 1962), American football linebacker
Kyle Clinton (born 1987), American soccer player
Kyle Coetzer (born 1985), Scottish cricketer
Kyle Coney (born 1990), Irish Gaelic footballer
Kyle Cook (born 1975), member of rock band Matchbox Twenty
Kyle Cooper (born 1962), designer of motion picture title sequences
Kyle Corning (1889–1970), pseudonym of American lawyer and author Erle Stanley Gardner
Kyle Cranmer (born 1977), American physicist and a professor at New York University
Kyle Creed (1912–1982), American musician and banjo luthier of 20th-century Appalachia
Kyle Crick (born 1992), American professional baseball pitcher
Kyle Critchell (born 1987), English footballer
Kyle Crutchmer (born 1993), American professional mixed martial artist
Kyle Culbertson (born 1992), American soccer player
Kyle Cumiskey (born 1986), Canadian ice hockey defenceman
Kyle Curinga (born 1993), American soccer player

D–H

Kyle Dake (born 1991), former American collegiate wrestler at Cornell University
Kyle Davis (disambiguation), multiple people
Kyle Davies (disambiguation), multiple people
Kyle De Silva (born 1993), English footballer
Kyle De'Volle (born 1989), British fashion designer
Kyle Degambur (born 1994), South African cricketer
Kyle Denney (born 1977), former Major League Baseball pitcher
Kyle Dempsey (born 1995), English professional footballer
Kyle DeVan (born 1985), American football guard
Kyle DiFulvio (born 1975), American singer-songwriter and musician
Kyle Dinkheller (died 1998), sheriff and murder victim
Kyle Dixon (disambiguation), multiple people
Kyle Dowdy (born 1993), American baseball player
Kyle Downes (born 1983), Canadian-American actor
Kyle Drabek (born 1987), American professional baseball pitcher
Kyle Dubas (born 1985), Canadian ice hockey manager
Kyle Dugger (born 1996), American football player
Kyle Duncan (born 1997), American soccer player
Kyle Bobby Dunn (born 1986), composer, arranger, and live performer of modern and neo-classical based drone music
Kyle Dunkley (born 2000), Australian football player
Kyle Dunnigan (born 1971), American comedian
Kyle Eastmond (born 1989), English professional rugby union and former professional rugby league footballer
Kyle Eastwood (born 1968), American jazz musician
Kyle Eckel (born 1981), American football fullback
Kyle Edmund (born 1995), South African-born British tennis player
Kyle Edwards (disambiguation), multiple people
Kyle Egan (born 1998), English footballer
Kyle Emanuel (born 1991), American football player
Kyle Even (born 1985), American member of rock band Breathe Carolina
Kyle Exume (born 1987), Canadian professional Canadian football running back
Kyle Falconer (born 1987), Scottish musician
Kyle Farmer (born 1990), American baseball player
Kyle Farnsworth (born 1976), Major League Baseball pitcher
Kyle Fawcett (born 1979), Canadian politician and current Member of the Legislative Assembly of Alberta
Kyle Feldt (born 1992), Australian professional rugby league footballer
Kyle Fiat (born 1983), American professional lacrosse player
Kyle Finch (born 1998), English professional squash player
Kyle Finn (born 1998), Irish football player
Kyle Finnegan (born 1991), American baseball player
Kyle Fisher (born 1994), American soccer player
Kyle Flanagan (disambiguation), multiple people
Kyle Flood (born 1971), American football head coach and former player
Kyle Fogg (born 1990), American professional basketball player
Kyle Foggo (born 1954), Republican and former American government intelligence officer
Kyle Fowler (born 1992), American stock car racing driver
Kyle Fraser-Allen (born 1990), English football player
Kyle Freadrich (born 1978), Canadian professional ice hockey player
Kyle Freeland (born 1993), American baseball player
Kyle Froman (born 1976), American dancer of the New York City Ballet
Kyle Fuller (disambiguation), multiple people
Kyle Funkhouser (born 1994), American professional baseball player
Kyle Gallner (born 1986), American actor
Kyle Gann (born 1955), American composer
Kyle Garlick (born 1992), American baseball player
Kyle Garrett (1956–2016), pseudonym of American comic book artist Gary Reed
Kyle Gass (born 1960), American actor and musician
Kyle Gibson (born 1987), American professional baseball pitcher
Kyle Gibson (basketball) (born 1987), American basketball player for Hapoel Galil Elyon of the Israeli Basketball Premier League
Kyle Gilmour (born 1988), Canadian rugby union flanker
Kyle Godwin (born 1992), Australian rugby union footballer
Kyle Goldwin (born 1985), Gibraltarian footballer
Kyle Good (born 1991), Irish hockey player
Kyle Gookins (born 1982), American soccer coach
Kyle Gourlay (born 1998), Scottish professional footballer
Kyle Graham (1899–1973), Major League Baseball pitcher
Kyle Graves (born 1989), Canadian soccer player
Kyle Greentree (born 1983), Canadian professional ice hockey player
Kyle Greig (born 1990), American soccer player
Kyle Greaux (born 1988), Trinidad and Tobago sprinter
Kyle Gupton (born 1990), American basketball player
Kyle Gurrieri (born 1998), American soccer player
Kyle Guy (born 1997), American basketball player
Kyle Hagel (born 1985), Canadian professional ice hockey player
Kyle Hamilton (disambiguation), multiple people
Kyle Justin Hamm (born 1975), American rock musician
Kyle Hardingham (born 1988), Australian rules footballer
Kyle Harris (born 1986), American actor
Kyle Harrison (born 1983), professional American lacrosse player
Kyle Hartigan (born 1991), Australian professional football player
Kyle Hartzell (born 1985), American lacrosse player
Kyle James Hauser (born 1985), American songwriter, multi-instrumentalist and singer
Kyle D. Hawkins (born 1980), American Solicitor General of Texas
Kyle Hawkins, American lacrosse head coach
Kyle Haynes (born 1991), English footballer
Kyle Hebert (born 1969), American voice actor and podcaster
Kyle T. Heffner (born 1957), American television and film actor
Kyle Helms (born 1986), Canadian professional ice hockey player
Kyle Helton (born 1986), American soccer player
Kyle Hendricks (born 1989), American baseball player
Kyle Henry, American independent filmmaker
Kyle Higashioka (born 1991), American baseball player
Kyle Higgins (born 1985), American comic book writer and film director
Kyle Hill (born 1979), American professional basketball player 
Kyle Hines (born 1986), American professional basketball player
Kyle Hinton (born 1998), American football player
Kyle Hodnett (born 1986), South African-born English cricketer
Kyle Hodsoll (born 1988), Bermudian cricketer
Kyle Hoffer (born 1989), American soccer player
Kyle Hogg (born 1983), English cricketer
Kyle Holder (born 1994), American professional baseball player
Kyle Hollingsworth (born 1968), American rock keyboard player 
Kyle Horch (born 1964), American classical saxophonist
Kyle Hosford (born 1989), Irish basketball player
Kyle Hotz (born 1950), American comic book writer and artist
Kyle Howard (born 1978), American actor
Kyle Howarth (born 1994), British speedway rider
Kyle Hudson (born 1987), American professional baseball outfielder                           
Kyle Hope, Barbados cricketer
Kyle Aaron Huff (1977–2006), Capitol Hill massacre mass murderer
Kyle Hughes (born 1989), British motorcycle speedway rider
Kyle Hunter (born 1973), Canadian badminton player
Kyle S. Hunter (born 1970), American art director and comic book artist
Kyle Hutton (born 1991), Scottish association footballer

I–M

Kyle Ihn (born 1994), American soccer player
Kyle Irion, American blogger and writer
Kyle Isbel (born 1997), American baseball player
Kyle Israel (born 1985), American starting college football quarterback
Kyle Jacobs (disambiguation), multiple people
Kyle Jameson (born 1998), English professional footballer 
Kyle Jamieson (born 1994), New Zealand cricketer
Kyle Janek (born 1958), Republican member of the Texas Senate
Kyle Jarrow (born 1979), American writer and rock musician
Kyle Jarvis (born 1989), Zimbabwean cricketer
Kyle Jason (born 1972), American singer, songwriter, musician and performer
Kyle Jean-Baptiste (1993–2015), American Broadway singer
Kyle Jeffery, Canadian sprint canoer
Kyle Jensen (born 1988), former American baseball player
Kyle Johansen (born 1967), Republican Majority Leader in the Alaska House of Representatives
Kyle Johnson (disambiguation), multiple people
Kyle Jones (disambiguation), multiple people
Kyle Julius (born 1979), Canadian basketball player
Kyle Justin (disambiguation), multiple people
Kyle Juszczyk (born 1991), American football fullback
Kyle Kacal (born 1969), Republican member of the Texas House of Representatives 
Kyle Kalis (born 1993), American football player
Kyle Kaplan (born 1990), American actor
Kyle Kashuv (born 2001), American conservative activist
Kyle Kelley (born 1985), American sports car racing driver
Kyle Kendrick (born 1984), American professional baseball pitcher
Kyle Kennedy, Irish singer on the television talent show The Voice of Ireland
Kyle Kentish (born 1985), British Grand Prix motorcycle racer
Kyle Kenyon (1924–1996), American Republican politician
Kyle Killen, American television writer and producer
Kyle Killion (born 1984), American football linebacker
Kyle Kinane (born 1976), American stand-up comedian
Kyle Kingsbury (born 1982), American mixed martial artist
Kyle Kirkwood (born 1998), American auto racing driver
Kyle Klubertanz (born 1985), professional American ice hockey defenseman
Kyle Knotek (born 1988), American soccer player
Kyle Knoyle (born 1996), English footballer
Kyle Knox (born 1989), Canadian football player
Kyle Koch (born 1984), professional Canadian football offensive linemen 
Kyle Konwea (born 1989), Swedish footballer
Kyle Kopp (born 1966), American water polo player
Kyle Korver (born 1981), American basketball player
Kyle Kosier (born 1978), American NFL football player with the Dallas Cowboys
Kyle Kragen (born 1993), American football player
Kyle Krisiloff (born 1986), American race car driver
Kyle Kubitza (born 1990), former American baseball player
Kyle Kuric (born 1989), American basketball player
Kyle Kuzma (born 1995), American basketball player
Kyle Labine (born 1983), Canadian actor
Kyle Lafferty (born 1987), Northern Irish association footballer
Kyle Lake (1972–2005), American pastor of University Baptist Church
Kyle Landas (born 1979), American fine art artist
Kyle Lander (born 1996), Scottish professional footballer
Kyle Landry (born 1990), Canadian professional basketball player
Kyle Larson (disambiguation), multiple people
Kyle Lauletta (born 1995), American football player
Kyle Legault (born 1985), Canadian speedway rider
Kyle Lehning (born 1949), American record producer
Kyle Letheren (born 1987), Welsh professional footballer 
Kyle Lewis (born 1995), American baseball player
Kyle Lightbourne (born 1968), former Bermudian footballer
Kyle Linahan, Australian singer and TV presenter
Kyle Lobstein (born 1989), American minor league baseball pitcher
Kyle Logue, American law professor
Kyle Lohse (born 1978), American baseball player
Kyle Long (born 1988), American football offensive guard
Kyle Lotzkar (born 1989), Canadian minor league baseball pitcher
Kyle Love (born 1986), American football defensive end
Kyle Lovett (born 1993), Australian professional rugby league footballer
Kyle Lowder (born 1980), American actor
Kyle Lowry (born 1986), American professional basketball player
Kyle Loza (born 1986), FMX freestyle motocross rider
Kyle Lukoff (born 1984), American author and former bookseller
Kyle Macaulay (born 1986), former Scottish professional footballer
Kyle Mack (born 1997), American snowboarder
Kyle Mackey (born 1962), former arena football League player
Kyle MacKinnon (born 1987), American hockey player
Kyle MacLachlan (born 1959), American actor
Kyle MacLeod (born 1992), American soccer player
Kyle Macy (born 1957), American basketball broadcaster
Kyle Magee (born 2001), Irish cricketer
Kyle Magennis (born 1998), Scottish professional footballer
Kyle Manscuk (born 1989), American soccer player
Kyle Markway (born 1997), American football player
Kyle Martel (born 1987), American professional stock car racing driver
Kyle Martin (disambiguation), multiple people
Kyle Martino (born 1981), American soccer player
Kyle Massey (born 1991), American actor
Kyle Dean Massey (born 1981), American theatre performer
Kyle Maxwell (born 1990), Barbadian judoka
Kyle Mayers (born 1992), Barbadian cricket player
Kyle Maynard (born 1986), American speaker, author, and mixed marshal artist
Kyle McAlarney (born 1987), American basketball coach
Kyle McAllister (born 1999), Scottish footballer
Kyle McAusland (born 1993), Scottish footballer
Kyle McCall (born 1992), Irish rugby union player
Kyle McCallan (born 1975), Irish cricketer
Kyle McCarley (born 1985), American voice actor
Kyle McCarter (born 1962), American ambassador to Kenya and member of the Illinois Senate
Kyle McCarthy (born 1986), American football player
Kyle McClean (born 1998), Northern Irish footballer 
Kyle McClellan (born 1984), American baseball player
Kyle McCord (disambiguation), multiple people
Kyle McCulloch (born 1962), Canadian writer
Kyle McFadzean (born 1991), English professional footballer
Kyle McGinn (born 1988), Australian politician
Kyle McGowin (born 1987), American baseball player
Kyle McGrath (born 1992), American baseball pitcher
Kyle McLaren (born 1977), Canadian ice hockey player
Kyle McNeely, real name for wrestler Onyx
Kyle McPherson (born 1987), American baseball player
Kyle E. McSlarrow (born 1960), former Deputy Secretary of the United States Department of Energy; Congressional candidate
Kyle Miller (disambiguation), multiple people
Kyle Milliken (born 1989), American computer hacker
Kyle Mills (born 1979), New Zealand cricketer
Kyle Minor (born 1976), American writer
Kyle Mitchell (born 1983), American-Canadian football player
Kyle Mooney (born 1984), American comedian
Kyle Moore (born 1986), American football player
Kyle Moore-Brown (born 1971), American football player
Kyle Moran (born 1987), Irish footballer
Kyle Morrell (born 1963), former American football defensive back
Kyle Morton (born 1994), American soccer player
Kyle Mosher (born 1985), American artist
Kyle Muller (born 1997), American baseball player
Kyle Mullica (born 1986), American politician
Kyle Munro (born 2001), Scottish professional footballer
Kyle Muntz (born 1990), American novelist
Kyle Murphy (disambiguation), multiple people

N–R

Kyle Nakazawa (born 1988), American soccer player
Kyle Naughton (born 1988), English footballer
Kyle Nelson (disambiguation), multiple people
Kyle Newacheck (born 1984), American filmmaker and actor
Kyle Newman (born 1976), American director, writer, producer and editor
Kyle Nipper (born 1987), South African cricketer
Kyle Nissen (born 1979), Canadian freestyle skier
Kyle Nix (born 1986), Australian-born English footballer
Kyle Noke (born 1980), Australian mixed martial artist 
Kyle Norris (born 1990), Canadian football player
Kyle Okposo (born 1988), American ice hockey player
Kyle Onstott (1887–1966), American novelist
Kyle Orton (born 1982), former American football player
Kyle O'Donnell (born 1990), Australian rugby player
Kyle O'Gara (born 1995), American racing driver
Kyle O'Quinn (born 1990), American NBA basketball player
Kyle O'Reilly (born 1987), Canadian professional wrestler
Kyle Padron (born 1991), American football player
Kyle Palmieri (born 1991), American hockey player
Kyle Pascual (born 1990), Filipino basketball player
Kyle Park (born 1985), American country singer
Kyle Parker (born 1989), American baseball player
Kyle Parrott (born 1985), Canadian long track speed skater
Kyle Patrick (born 1986), American singer-songwriter
Kyle Patterson (born 1986), English footballer 
Kyle Pennington (born 1979), American television writer
Kyle Perry (born 1986), English footballer
Kyle Peschel (born 1979), American video game producer
Kyle Peterson (born 1976), American baseball player
Kyle Pettey, Canadian paralympian
Kyle Petty (born 1960), American racing commentator
Kyle Philips (born 1999), American football player
Kyle Phillips (disambiguation), multiple people
Kyle Pierce, American professor
Kyle Pitts (born 2000), American football player
Kyle Platzer (born 1995), Canadian hockey player
Kyle Plott (born 1996), American professional stock car racing driver
Kyle Polak (born 1984), American soccer player
Kyle Pontifex (born 1980), New Zealand field hockey player
Kyle Porter (born 1990), Canadian soccer player
Kyle Prandi (born 1979), American Olympic diver
Kyle Prater (born 1992), American football player
Kyle Prepolec (born 1989), Canadian mixed martial arts fighter
Kyle Pruett (born 1943), American physician and author
Kyle Pryor (born 1984), English actor
Kyle Puccia (born 1970), American recording artist
Kyle Queiro (born 1994), American football player
Kyle Quincey (born 1985), Canadian hockey player
Kyle Quinlan (born 1989), American football coach
Kyle Rae (born 1954), Canadian politician
Kyle Randall (born 1991), American basketball player
Kyle Rankin (born 1972), American filmmaker
Kyle Rapps (born 1980), American hip-hop musician
Kyle Rasmussen (born 1968), American alpine skier
Kyle Rau (born 1992), American hockey player
Kyle Rea (born 1981), American actor and producer
Kyle Rees (born 1988), Welsh actor
Kyle Reeves (born 1971), former Canadian ice hockey player
Kyle Regnault (born 1988), American baseball player
Kyle Reifers (born 1983), American professional golfer
Kyle Reimers (born 1989), Australian footballer
Kyle Renfro (born 1991), American soccer player
Kyle Reynish (born 1983), American soccer player
Kyle Riabko (born 1987), Canadian musician
Kyle Richards (born 1969), American actress
Kyle Richardson (born 1973), American football player
Kyle Rideout (born 1984), Canadian actor, writer and director
Kyle Rittenhouse (born 2003), American defendant acquitted in the 2020 Kenosha unrest shooting
Kyle Roberts (born 1992), American football player
Kyle Roller (born 1988), American baseball player
Kyle Ross (born 1983), former Canadian professional lacrosse player
Kyle Rossiter (born 1980), Canadian hockey player
Kyle Rote (1927–2002), American football player
Kyle Rote, Jr. (born 1950), American soccer player
Kyle Rowe (born 1998), Scottish rugby union player
Kyle Rowley (born 1979), American football player
Kyle Rubisch (born 1988), American lacrosse player
Kyle Rudolph (born 1989), American football player
Kyle Russell (born 1986), American baseball player
Kyle Ryan (born 1991), American baseball player
Kyle Ryde (born 1997), British motorcycle road racer

S–Z

Kyle Salyards (born 1980), American swimmer
Kyle Sampson (born 1969), American politician and attorney
Kyle Sandilands (born 1971), Australian radio presenter
Kyle Saylors (born 1973), American film producer
Kyle Saxelid (born 1995), Canadian football player
Kyle Schickner, American film producer
Kyle Schmid (born 1984), Canadian actor
Kyle Schuneman (born 1985), American interior designer
Kyle Schwarber (born 1993), American baseball player
Kyle Scott (born 1997), English footballer
Kyle Seager (born 1987), American baseball player
Kyle Secor (born 1957), American television and film actor
Kyle Seeback (born 1970), Canadian lawyer
Kyle Segebart (born 1987), American soccer player
Kyle Selig (born 1992), American actor
Kyle Shelford (born 1996), English professional rugby league footballer
Kyle Shanahan (born 1979), American football coach
Kyle Shepherd (born 1987), South African musician
Kyle Shewfelt (born 1982), American gymnast
Kyle Shurmur (born 1996), American football player
Kyle Sieg (born 2001), American NASCAR driver
Kyle Sinckler (born 1993), English professional rugby player
Kyle Singer (born 1980), American soccer player
Kyle Singler (born 1988), American basketball player
Kyle Skipworth (born 1990), American baseball player
Kyle Sleeth (born 1981), American baseball player
Kyle Sloter (born 1994), American football player
Kyle E. Smalley (born 1961), American amateur astronomer
Kyle Smith (disambiguation), multiple people
Kyle Snyder (disambiguation), multiple people
Kyle Sokol (born 1974), American bassist and skateboarder
Kyle Soller (born 1983), American actor
Kyle Sonnenburg (born 1986), Canadian-German ice hockey player
Kyle Sorensen (born 1986), Canadian lacrosse player
Kyle South (born 1981), American politician
Kyle Spence (born 1997), English professional footballer
Kyle Spencer (born 1976), American tennis player
Kyle Spencer (born 1992), British Soldier
Kyle Stanford (born 1970), American professor
Kyle Stanger (born 1997), British actor
Kyle Stanley (born 1987), American professional golfer
Kyle Staver (born 1953), American artist
Kyle Steenland (born 1946), American professor
Kyle Steyn (born 1994), Scottish rugby union player
Kyle Stolk (born 1996), Dutch competitive swimmer
Kyle Storer (born 1987), English footballer
Kyle Stowers (born 1998), American baseball player
Kyle Strickler (born 1983), American professional dirt track racing driver
Kyle Sullivan (born 1988), American actor
Kyle Sumsion (born 1993), American rugby union player
Kyle Sutton (born 1980), American hip-hop artist
Kyle Swanston (born 1986), former American basketball player
Kyle Sweeney (born 1981), American professional lacrosse player
Kyle Switzer (born 1985), Canadian actor
Kyle Swords (born 1974), American soccer player 
Kyle Taylor (born 1999), English professional footballer
Kyle Testerman (1934–2015), American mayor of Knoxville, Tennessee
Kyle Thomas (born 1983), Canadian filmmaker
Kyle Thompson (born 1992), American photographer
Kyle Thousand (born 1980), American sports agent
Kyle Tonetti (born 1987), South African born Irish rugby player
Kyle Townsend (born 1978), American record producer
Kyle Trask (born 1998), American football player
Kyle Traynor (born 1986), Scottish rugby union player
Kyle Tress (born 1981), American skeleton racer
Kyle Troup (born 1991), American professional ten-pin bowler
Kyle Trout (born 1991), British rugby player
Kyle Tucker (born 1997), American baseball player
Kyle Tudge (born 1987), Welsh cricketer
Kyle Turley (born 1975), American football player for the Kansas City Chiefs
Kyle Turnbull (born 1995), Scottish professional footballer
Kyle Turris (born 1989), Canadian ice hockey player
Kyle Tyler (born 1996), American baseball player
Kyle Uyehara (born 1989), American short track speed skater
Kyle Van Noy (born 1991), American football player
Kyle Vanden Bosch (born 1978), American football player
Kyle Vander Kuyp (born 1971), Australian athlete
Kyle Vashkulat (born 1990), Ukrainian-American judoka
Kyle Vassell (born 1993), Northern Irish professional footballer
Kyle Velasquez (1982–1998), victim of the Columbine Shooting
Kyle Veris (born 1983), American soccer player
Kyle Vinales (born 1992), American basketball player
Kyle Vincent (born 1967), American singer-songwriter
Kyle Visser (born 1985), American basketball player
Kyle Vogt, American engineer
Kyle Wachholtz (born 1972), American football player
Kyle Wailes (born 1983), Canadian lacrosse player 
Kyle Waldrop (born 1991), American baseball player
Kyle Walker (born 1990), English footballer
Kyle Wanvig (born 1981), Canadian hockey player
Kyle Ward (disambiguation), multiple people
Kyle Watson, ultimate fighter
Kyle Wealleans (born 1969), New Zealand cricketer
Kyle Weatherman (born 1997), American professional stock car racing driver
Kyle Weaver (born 1986), American professional basketball player
Kyle Weems (born 1989), American basketball player
Kyle Weiland (born 1986), American baseball player
Kyle Wellwood (born 1983), Canadian ice hockey player
Kyle White (born 1970), Australian rugby league footballer
Kyle Whittingham (born 1959), American football coach
Kyle Wieche (born 1967), American alpine skier
Kyle Wilber (born 1989), American football player
Kyle Wilkie (born 1991), Scottish footballer
Kyle Williams (disambiguation), multiple people
Kyle Wilson (disambiguation), multiple people
Kyle Wiltjer (born 1992), Canadian-American basketball player
Kyle Winter (born 1974), former American rugby union player
Kyle Wood (disambiguation), multiple people
Kyle Woodring (1967–2009), American studio artist
Kyle Wootton (born 1996), English footballer
Kyle Wren (born 1991), American baseball player
Kyle Wright (born 1995), American baseball player
Kyle Yamada (born 1983), Canadian soccer player
Kyle Yamashita (born 1959), American politician
Kyle York (born 1982), American football player
Kyle Yousaf (born 1990), British professional boxer
Kyle Zajec (born 1997), American soccer player
Kyle Zenoni (born 1984), American soccer player
Kyle Zimmer (born 1991), American baseball player
Kyle Zobeck (born 1990), American soccer player

Fictional characters 

 Kyle, a wolf villager in the Animal Crossing series
 Kyle, a character in the video game Suikoden V
 Kyle, foster sister of Andy Barclay from the Child's Play franchise
 Kyle Abbot, a villain in Detective Comics
 Kyle Baker, character in Cheaper by the Dozen and its sequel
 Kyle Baldwin, a character in The 4400
 Kyle Bateman, a character in Instant Star
 Kyle Bloodworth-Thomason, a character from the animated series Fanboy & Chum Chum
 Kyle Blueman, a character in the series CHERUB
 Kyle Boone, a character in NCIS
 Kyle Braxton, a character in Home and Away
 Kyle Brody, a character in Charmed
 Kyle Broflovski, one of the main characters in South Park
 Kyle Butler, a character in the television series Dexter
 Kyle Canning, a character in Neighbours
 Kyle Crane, the player character in Dying Light
 Kyle Drako, a character in Milo Murphy's Law
 Kyle Gibney, a Marvel Comics character also known as Wild Child
 Kyle Graham, the main character in the 2006 TV drama film After Thomas
 Kyle Hadley, a character in the 1956 film Written on the Wind
 Kyle Harmon, a character in the television series CSI: Miami
 Kyle Hirons, character in the 2011 film 50/50
 Kyle Katarn, the main character of the Star Wars: Jedi Knight series
 Kyle Kingsbury, the main character in the book and film Beastly
 Kyle Klim, a character from the visual novel game Zero Escape: Virtue's Last Reward
 Kyle Merkulov, a character from the video game Astral Chain
 Kyle Pascoe, a character from the British TV series Footballers' Wives'
 Kyle Rayner, a DC Comics character
 Kyle Reese, a character from the Terminator franchise
 Kyle Richmond, also known as Nighthawk, from Marvel Comics
 Kyle Ryder, a character from the British soap opera Hollyoaks Kyle Schwartz, a character in South Park Kyle Singer, supporting character from the series 24 Kyle Trager, the main character in the television series Kyle XY Kyle Travers, a character in the Final Fight game series
 Kyle Valenti, a character from the book series Roswell High Kyle Vlaros, the main character of the video game Blackthorne Kyle Wilkins, a character from the animated series American Dragon: Jake Long''

See also
 Kyle (disambiguation)
 Kylie (name), unrelated but has a similar spelling

References

English unisex given names
Scottish masculine given names
Scottish unisex given names
English masculine given names